The Emma Treadwell Thacher Nature Center opened in July 2001 and is located near the shore of Thompson's Lake between Thompson's Lake State Park and John Boyd Thacher State Park in New York's Albany County (United States).

See also 
List of New York state parks

External links  
  ETT Nature Center

Nature centers in New York (state)
Museums in Albany County, New York
Natural history museums in New York (state)